Swimming is one of the sports at the quadrennial Mediterranean Games competition, a regional multi-sports event open to athletes from countries located around the Mediterranean Sea. It has been one of the sports featured in every event since the inaugural edition in 1951.

Editions

Events
As of the most recent 2018 edition, the swimming program features 19 men's and 19 women's events. Four men's events have been held every time since the inaugural 1951 edition (100 m freestyle, 400 m freestyle, 200 m breaststroke, and 4 × 200 m freestyle relay).

In the first four editions from 1951 to 1963 the swimming program only featured men's events. The program was expanded to include women for the 1967 edition, with only three events initially available to them (100 m freestyle, 100 m backstroke, 100 m breaststroke). New events were gradually added over the decades so that full parity was achieved by 2001.

All current events are contested by men and women, the sole exception being the longest-distance freestyle swimming race - the 1500 m event is men only and the 800 m event is women only.

Men's events

Women's events

All-time medal table
Updated after the 2022 Mediterranean Games

Games records

References

External links
International Mediterranean Games Committee

 
Sports at the Mediterranean Games
Mediterranean Games